Eight Deadly Shots or Eight Fatal Shots is a Finnish drama film directed, written, produced by and starring Mikko Niskanen. Originally released as a four-part, five-hour miniseries in spring 1972, it was edited into a 145-minute movie by Jörn Donner.

The film was inspired by a 7 March 1969 mass shooting incident in Pihtipudas, Finland, in which a small farmer shot and killed four armed policemen who had come to calm him down after he drove his family out of the house in a drunken rage. The film focuses on depicting a fictionalised chain of events leading up to the killings, as imagined by director Niskanen. The main character's name was changed.

Both professional and amateur actors were used. Issues with the schedule and budget led executives at Yleisradio to seriously consider calling off the production, but this was averted.

In 2018, the film was selected as part of Martin Scorsese's World Cinema Project with the aim of reaching international distribution as a restored 35 mm screening copy and a digital 4K copy.

Plot
A Central Finnish smallfarmer, Pasi, tries to work odd jobs to provide for his family under meager conditions, but also starts moonshining with his friend Reiska and lapses into alcoholism. Pasi's wife is forced to endure and fear his drunken violence, and he repeatedly needs to be calmed by police.

Pasi's wife argues with him about his drinking, he is bothered by recurring physical pains and hangovers, and he develops a bad temper which starts to frighten his wife and children. His family is also humiliated as he gets into a fight, skips a sermon which he disrupts by shooting a gun outside, and is confronted by police who start visiting his home frequently. The film ends with a final outburst in which Pasi scares his family away and shoots after them with a rifle. When police arrive, Pasi shoots the officers dead, goes over to his neighbors' house and tells them to call the police chief. He is sentenced to life in prison.

Cast

Reception
Eight Deadly Shots has often been considered one of the most esteemed Finnish movies. It was tied for "best Finnish movie" in a polling of film critics in 1992; in 2012, critics voted it the fifth-best Finnish movie. Aki Kaurismäki described the longer, miniseries version as "one of the masterpieces of European cinema".

, the man who committed the real-life killings the film was based on, saw the movie in prison and commented on it: "This is so true that it makes me laugh and cry at times. That is how life was back there. My fate in life was so accurately portrayed that it is like ripped from my soul."

See also
 List of films considered the best

References

Gun violence in popular culture
Alcohol abuse in fiction
Films based on actual events
1972 films
Finnish drama films
Films set in Finland
Films shot in Finland
Films about mass murder
Finnish television miniseries
1970s television miniseries
Films about social issues
Films about alcoholism
Mass shootings in Finland
Films about poverty
Mental health in fiction
Crimes committed against law enforcement